Jinping District is the central business district and the seat of Shantou prefecture-level city in the Guangdong Province of Mainland China.  The site the district stands on is the old city of Shantou established by Emperor Hongwu of the Ming Dynasty in AD 1369, with the name derived from Shashantou Fort built in the city 4 centuries later. The Jinping administrative district was established in 2003, and serves as a major hub for manufacturing, shipping and tourism. The district government is located at No. 50 Jinsha Middle Road.

Administrative divisions 
There are 12 subdistricts in the district:

Famous Sites and Landmarks
Shantou City Hall - Established in AD 1921 during the old Republic of China.
Shashantou Fort - Established in AD 1717 by Emperor Kangxi of the Qing Dynasty.
Haibin Stadium - The downtown Shantou soccer arena.

Education
Feixia Middle School

References

Shantou
County-level divisions of Guangdong